The 2007 Asian Beach Volleyball Championships (7th tournament) was a beach volleyball event, that was held from April 13 to 15, 2007 in Samila Beach, Songkhla, Thailand. 46 teams including 22 women's squads from 15 AVC members participated in this tournament.

Medal summary

Participating nations

Men

 (2)
 (2)
 (2)
 (2)
 (2)
 (1)
 (1)
 (2)
 (2)
 (1)
 (2)
 (3)
 (2)

Women

 (1)
 (2)
 (2)
 (2)
 (1)
 (2)
 (2)
 (2)
 (1)
 (1)
 (2)
 (3)
 (1)

Men's tournament

Women's tournament

References 

Final Rankings in the 7th Asian Beach Volleyball Championships in Thailand

External links
Asian Volleyball Confederation

Asian Championships
Beach volleyball
International volleyball competitions hosted by Thailand
Asian Beach Volleyball Championship
Songkhla